Edith Balas is a Professor of Art History, College of Humanities & Social Sciences at Carnegie Mellon University in Pittsburgh, Pennsylvania.  Born June 20, 1929 in Cluj, Romania, she is a Holocaust survivor, art professor and historian.

Biography
She is the widow of the late mathematician Egon Balas, who was a professor at Carnegie Mellon.

Balas' main areas of interest are modern art (1890-1960), painting and sculpture, and the art of the Italian Renaissance. In 2003, she curated an exhibition at the Frick Art Museum, and several in Pittsburgh, Paris, New York and Budapest. She has been teaching at Carnegie Mellon University since 1977, and is also an Adjunct Professor of History of Art and Architecture at the University of Pittsburgh.

Balas is also a Holocaust survivor, having been sent to the Nazi death camp Auschwitz.  In Bird in Flight: Memoir of a Survivor and Scholar,  Balas tells her story of facing grim situations and becoming what she describes as a “professional survivor.”  Balas named her memoir “Bird in Flight” after Constantin Brâncuși’s famous sculpture of the same name. “I consider it emblematic of my life,” she said.

After the war, her husband was imprisoned by the communist authorities for three years, during which Balas raised their two daughters. She received an M.A. in Philosophy from the University of Bucharest in 1952. She then emigrated to the United States with her husband, and received an M.A. in the History of Arts from Pittsburgh University in 1970 and a Ph.D. in 1973.

Works

 Edith Balas, "Michelangelo's Medici Chapel: A New Interpretation", Philadelphia, 1995

See also
List of Holocaust survivors

References

Romanian art historians
Carnegie Mellon University faculty
Auschwitz concentration camp survivors
Living people
1929 births
Romanian emigrants to the United States
University of Pittsburgh alumni
Writers from Cluj-Napoca
Jewish American writers
Jewish women writers
American art historians
Women art historians
University of Bucharest alumni
Romanian women writers